Jackson Township (T35N R6E) is one of sixteen townships in Elkhart County, Indiana. As of the 2010 census, its population was 4,288.

History
Jackson Township was named for Col. John Jackson, a pioneer settler.

Geography
Frog Pond is in this township.

Cities and towns
 New Paris

Unincorporated towns
 Bainter Town

Adjacent townships
 Elkhart Township (north)
 Clinton Township (northeast)
 Benton Township (east)
 Turkey Creek Township, Kosciusko County (southeast)
 Van Buren Township, Kosciusko County (south)
 Jefferson Township, Kosciusko County (southwest)
 Union Township (west)
 Harrison Township (northwest)

Major highways

Cemeteries
The township contains several cemeteries, including the historic Bainter Town cemetery, which opened in 1832.

References
 
 United States Census Bureau cartographic boundary files

External links
 Indiana Township Association
 United Township Association of Indiana

Townships in Elkhart County, Indiana
Townships in Indiana